David Lipton (born November 9, 1953) is an American economist who served as the Acting Managing Director of the International Monetary Fund from July 2, 2019, following Christine Lagarde's nomination as President of the European Central Bank, until Kristalina Georgieva was appointed in the office on October 1, 2019. Prior to this, Lipton had been serving as the IMF's First Deputy Managing Director since September 2011. Lipton has been featured in, and interviewed by, numerous publications including The Financial Times, Euromoney, Bloomberg News, and The Guardian.

Life and work
David Lipton was born on November 9, 1953 in Boston, Massachusetts and received an undergraduate degree from Wesleyan University in 1975, followed by a PhD in Economics from Harvard University in 1982, under the supervision of Jeffrey Sachs. He then started working for the International Monetary Fund, after which he joined Jeffrey Sachs advising governments of transition economies, such as Russia, Poland, and Slovenia, also writing frequently on the topic. He subsequently started working for the Clinton administration in 1993 as Under Secretary of the Treasury for International Affairs, from which position he worked on the Asian financial crisis. Upon leaving the public sector, Lipton joined a hedge fund (Moore Capital Management), followed by a stint at Citi Bank where he became Head of Global Country Risk Management.

Prior to joining the IMF, David Lipton served as Special Assistant to President Barack Obama, while also being part of the National Economic Council and National Security Council at the White House.

In 2021 Lipton was named a senior counselor to Treasury Secretary Janet Yellen, focusing on policy work with US allies and working with the G7 and G20 summits.

References 

1953 births
21st-century American economists
20th-century American economists
Acting Managing directors of the International Monetary Fund
Citigroup employees
Clinton administration personnel
Economists from Massachusetts
Harvard University alumni
Living people
Obama administration personnel
People from Boston
United States Department of the Treasury officials
United States National Security Council staffers
Wesleyan University alumni